Van Aalten or van Aalten, a family name meaning "from Aalten", may refer to:

Jacques Van Aalten, an American artist born in Antwerp, Belgium
Thomas van Aalten, a Dutch writer
Truus van Aalten, a Dutch actress who appeared in many German films in the 1920s and 1930s

Dutch-language surnames
Surnames of Dutch origin